UZINFOCOM is a single integrator for creation and support of state information systems in the Republik of Uzbekistan. Was established in 2002, by the Decree of the President of the Republic of Uzbekistan, the State Unitary Enterprise Center for the Development and Implementation of Computer and Information Technologies UZINFOCOM under the Uzbek Agency for Communications and Informatization (UzACI).

History 
 On October 18, 2002, UZINFOCOM signed an agreement with ICANN and became the administrator of the top-level domain ".uz";
By the Decree of the President of the Republic of Uzbekistan No. PP-4321 dated 05/18/2019, the state share of UZINFOCOM was transferred to UMS.
 On August 29, 2019, was renamed as a single integrator for creation and support of state information systems in the Republik of Uzbekistan and was re-registered as LLC (Limitet Liability Company) for work on projects as publik-private partners;
 In April 2022, a regional division of UZINFOCOM for the Xorazm Region was opened in the city of Urgench;
 In May 2022, a regional division oz UZINFOCOM for the Fergana Region was opened in the city of Fergana;

CEO
 from 2002 to 2005 — Xadjaev Alisher Djuraqulovich
 from 2005 to 2013 — Rahimov Djalolatdin Kamiljanovich
 from 2013 to 2015 — Djurayev Ibroxim Djurayevich
 from 2015 to 2016 — Saidaliyev G‘ayratxo‘ja Gafarxo‘jayevich 
 from 2016 to 2017 — Isayev Xusan Nurullayevich
 2017 — Muxitdinov Aziz Hakimovich (temporary acting director)
 2018 — Tagaliyev Ulug‘bek Abdunabiyevich (temporary acting director)
 2018 — Ugay Aleksandr Fedorovich
 2018 — Po‘latov Farrux Jaxongirovich
 2018 — Rahimov Djalolatdin Kamiljanovich
 from 5-th July 2019 to today — Gimranov Emil Ildarovich

Performance
The first websites of the main organizations of the Republic were written by UZINFOCOM specialists.
In 2009, UZINFOCOM became the operator of the first data processing center (DPC) in the country (dc.uz). 
Also, UZINFOCOM is the technical operator of the Data Processing Center (DPC) of the electronic government of the Republic of Uzbekistan and provides the operation of the single portal of interactive state services my.gov.uz (EPIGU), the virtual reception of the President (pm.gov.uz), and the portal of public opinion meningfikrim.uz

Projects
 The virtual reception of the President
 The single portal of interactive state services(EPIGU)
 The administrator of the top-level domain .UZ
 Educational portal ZiyoNet
 Data centre dc.uz
 The portal of public opinion
 Electronic Parliament
 Online polyclinic

In 2022, the UZINFOCOM team started developing an open source solution for the Xinux operating system based on the Linux kernel.

The international cooperation
 On October 18, 2002 UZINFOCOM signed an agreement with ICANN and became a top-level domain administrator.
 In June 2022, a Memorandum of Cooperation was signed with SE Infocom Kyrgyzstan.

References 

Science and technology in Uzbekistan
Communications in Uzbekistan
2002 establishments in Uzbekistan